Kevin Carberry (born May 19, 1983) is an American football coach and former defensive lineman who is the assistant offensive line coach for the New Orleans Saints of the National Football League (NFL). He played college football at Ohio prior to playing professionally, spending time as a member of the Detroit Lions, Berlin Thunder of NFL Europe, New York Dragons and the Philadelphia Soul of the Arena Football League (AFL).

College career 
Carberry was a four-year letterman at Ohio, where he was named a second-team All-MAC selection in 2004 as a team captain. He graduated from Ohio in 2005 with a degree in marketing.

Professional career 
After going undrafted in the 2005 NFL Draft, Carberry attended the Cleveland Browns training camp but did not make the roster. He was signed to the Detroit Lions practice squad for the remainder of the 2005 season. After a stint with the Berlin Thunder of NFL Europe in spring 2006, Carberry attended the training camp of the Carolina Panthers but was not signed. After spending 2007 with the New York Dragons of the Arena Football League, Carberry joined the Philadelphia Soul in 2008, and was a member of the Soul when they captured ArenaBowl XXII in 2008.

Coaching career 
Carberry coached at St. Ignatius College Prep in Chicago during the Arena Football League offseasons as the program's defensive coordinator and special teams coach. At the conclusion of his playing career, he joined the coaching staff at Kansas Jayhawks as a graduate assistant before going on to Stephen F. Austin as the defensive ends coach in 2012.

Dallas Cowboys
Carberry joined the Dallas Cowboys coaching staff in 2014 as an offensive assistant.

Washington Redskins
Carberry departed to join the Washington Redskins in 2016 as their assistant offensive line coach under former Cowboys offensive coordinator Bill Callahan.

Stanford 
Carberry was named the run game coordinator and offensive line coach at Stanford in 2018.

Los Angeles Rams 
Carberry was hired as the offensive line coach for the Los Angeles Rams in 2021, reuniting him with former Washington offensive coordinator Sean McVay. In Carberry's first season with the Rams, they won Super Bowl LVI against the Cincinnati Bengals. He was fired on January 18, 2023.

References

External links 
 Kevin Carberry on Twitter
 Stanford profile

1983 births
Living people
People from Oak Lawn, Illinois
Players of American football from Illinois
Coaches of American football from Illinois
American football defensive linemen
Ohio Bobcats football players
Cleveland Browns players
Detroit Lions players
Berlin Thunder players
Carolina Panthers players
New York Dragons players
Philadelphia Soul players
High school football coaches in Illinois
Kansas Jayhawks football coaches
Stephen F. Austin Lumberjacks football coaches
Dallas Cowboys coaches
Washington Redskins coaches
Stanford Cardinal football coaches
Los Angeles Rams coaches